The Gallows Act II is a 2019 American supernatural horror film written and directed by Chris Lofing and Travis Cluff. It stars Ema Horvath, Chris Milligan and Brittany Falardeau. It is the sequel to the 2015 found footage film The Gallows. However, unlike its predecessor, this film does not utilize the found footage filming technique.

It was released on October 25, 2019 in theaters, on demand and digital by Lionsgate. As with the first film, critical reception for The Gallows Act II has been predominantly negative.

Plot  
Teenage friends Victor, Lex, Scott, Nick, and Marcus record a video of them doing a variation of ‘The Charlie Charlie Challenge’ by having Victor read a passage from ‘The Gallows,’ the reportedly cursed play that killed high school actor Charlie Grimille. Paranormal activity seemingly plagues the basement. Later, Victor finds Marcus hanged outside with swing set chains. The supposedly supernatural serial killer The Hangman strangles Victor with another chain.

Aspiring actress Auna Rue moves in with her prop and dressmaker sister Lisa so she can attend Fellbrook High School, which has a prestigious drama program. On her first day, Auna embarrasses herself in front of Mr. Schlake’s class by poorly performing a monologue from ‘Return to Thayolund,’ a fantasy movie Auna has been obsessed with since childhood. Auna recovers somewhat when schoolmate Cade Parker takes a romantic interest in her.

A user named ‘almostfamous99’ interacts with Auna via chat on her unpopular YouTube channel. Almostfamous99 links Auna to Victor’s viral video of having apparently conjured paranormal activity by reading from The Gallows.

Desperate to bump up her subscriber base after seeing Victor’s video had 16 million views, Auna obtains a copy of The Gallows from the school library. Auna becomes unusually obsessed with the play and later uploads a video of her reading from it.

Auna becomes the star of Mr. Schlake’s class when she performs a monologue from The Gallows. Auna’s video also balloons in popularity after viewers notice a table moving during her reading. Auna records a second reading during which an object flies across her bedroom.

Auna and Cade bond during an ice cream date. Cade introduces Auna to his parents, who turn out to be famous actors Craig and Kate Parker.

While Cade stops at a gas station, Auna becomes spooked by the brief reflection of a hanging man in the rearview mirror. Two young girls claiming to be new fans of Auna’s YouTube channel recognize Auna and ask for a selfie, which is how Auna learns a figure appeared behind her during the second video.

Another message from almostfamous99 directs Auna to a Charlie Challenge fan page. There, Auna learns about Charlie Grimille while browsing videos of hanging deaths and paranormal activity.

Apparent paranormal activity slams a closet door on Auna’s hand. Auna briefly sees The Hangman stalking her in Lisa’s home.

At a party, Auna and Cade sneak away to a treehouse to make out. Auna becomes entranced and has a vision of The Hangman killing Cade. Rattled, Auna demands to go home when she realizes she had been choking Cade while they were kissing.

‘Return to Thayolund’ suddenly starts playing on Lisa’s TV. The Hangman stalks Lisa until Auna returns home.

As haunting visions continue unraveling her mind, Auna tells Mr. Schlake she doesn’t want to read from The Gallows anymore. Auna somehow still recites a monologue from the play even though she thought she was performing Return to Thayolund.

Auna blocks almostfamous99 when his messages turn taunting. Auna also starts watching distressing confessional videos posted by Victor’s friend Lex, who reveals a disfiguring mark on her neck similar to one that Auna mysteriously obtained.

Lisa follows a rope to a tree outside where she finds her dog hanging dead. Claiming it is hurting them both, Lisa rips up Auna’s copy of the play. An argument causes Lisa to lash out by saying Auna isn’t talented enough to be a successful actress.

Auna unsuccessfully tries to intervene via text when she watches Lex, distraught with suicidal tendencies, prepare to hang herself during a livestream. The Hangman seemingly kills Lex.

Auna finds her copy of The Gallows mysteriously returned to her back pocket. Auna performs a passage from the play for NYU talent scout Scott Lamont. As he offers her a full scholarship following her reading, Auna envisions a noose strangling Lamont.

Lisa packs to leave for a show she is working on, but her suitcase inexplicably vanishes from her hand and returns to her bed. Paranormal activity violently shakes Lisa’s house. The Hangman strangles Lisa.

Cade researches the deaths that took place at Beatrice High School. An article suggests invoking Charlie Grimille’s name summons the hangman character he was supposed to play in The Gallows. Footage from a police officer’s bodycam shows a ghost killing the cops who arrested Pfeifer Ross, the crazed daughter of Charlie Grimille, and her mother. Cade discovers that the two women were committed to a nearby mental hospital.

With almostfamous99 still harassing her online, Cade takes Auna to see Pfeifer in hopes of finding a way to stop The Hangman’s curse. Pfeifer claims the only way to appease The Hangman is to offer a willing sacrifice to be killed.

Cade and Auna are abducted outside the asylum. They recover to find themselves on a gallows with nooses around their necks in a forest. The Hangman appears. A hooded executioner tells the duo they must decide who will be sacrificed.

Before Auna can stop him, Cade volunteers. A trap door opens beneath his feet and Cade begins hanging. Auna offers her life to save Cade’s. Another trap door opens and Auna hangs.

After Auna dies, additional hangmen emerge from the forest. They unmask to reveal Victor, Lex, Cade’s parents, and Auna’s two fans from the gas station among many other participants in a conspiracy to drive Auna mad. Cade removes his harness. Cade identifies himself as almostfamous99 while addressing a camera to proclaim their cabal executed a perfect Charlie Challenge.

Cast 
 Ema Horvath as Auna Rue
Chris Milligan as Cade Parker
 Brittany Falardeau as Lisa Rue
 Anthony Jensen as Scott Lamont
 Dennis Hurley as Mr. Schlake 
 Jono Cota as Victor
 Erika Miranda as Lex
 Jener Dasilva as Nick
 Charles Chudabala as Stage Hand
 Stefmerie Halstead as Empress
 Pfeifer Brown as Pfeifer Ross
 Travis Cluff as Charlie Grimille (uncredited)

Production
Principal photography on the film began in October 2016, with filming locations including San Joaquin College of Law in Clovis, California.

After filming and post-production was completed, a special early screening took place at the Warner Bros. lot in Burbank, California in August 2017, for fans aged 13–25.

Release
The film was released on October 25, 2019 in theaters, on demand and digital by Lionsgate, unlike the first film, Warner Bros. and New Line Cinema have no involvement with the sequel.

Critical response
On Rotten Tomatoes, the film has a rating of 0% based on reviews from 12 critics.
Glenn Kenny of The New York Times called it "a thoroughly undistinguished follow-up", and criticized the film's lack of logic. Justin Lowe from The Hollywood Reporter offered the film similar criticism, writing, "Lofing and Cluff’s script blends horror and thriller elements without ever settling on a clear genre choice. The film’s surprising final twist only serves to emphasize its narrative incoherence, precipitated by insufficient backstory and inadequate character development." Brian Tallerico of Roger Ebert.com gave the film a thumbs down, calling it Blumhouse's worst film, and criticised the film's script, shallow characters, story, and overuse of jump-scares.

References

External links 
 

2019 films
2019 horror thriller films
2010s supernatural horror films
2010s supernatural thriller films
American horror thriller films
American supernatural horror films
American supernatural thriller films
American teen horror films
Films produced by Jason Blum
Blumhouse Productions films
Lionsgate films
American sequel films
Found footage films
2010s English-language films
2010s American films